Dananir al Barmakiyya (late 8th-century - early 9th-century) was an Arabian Qiyan-courtesan musician, singer and poet. She is also known as the author of the famous Book of Songs.

She was from Medina. She was sold to Yahya ibn Khalid al-Barmaki.

As a slave, she was trained to become a qiyan. She was a student of the qiyan-musician Badhl, who was known for the number of songs she retained in her memory. Among her instructors were Ishaf al-Mausuli, Ibn Jami and Fulaih.

Dananir is noted as one of the most famous quian-musicians. She is described as an accomplished poet, musician and singer. As a singer, she was popular with 
the Abbasid Caliph Harun al-Rashid (r. 786–809), who visited his minister's house in Baghdad to hear her perform, and gave her extravagant gifts, including a necklace worth 30,000 gold coins.

She is most known as the author of the famous Book of Songs.

References

8th-century women musicians
9th-century women musicians
Arabian slaves and freedmen
Medieval singers
Qiyan
8th-century women from the Abbasid Caliphate
Slaves from the Abbasid Caliphate
9th-century women from the Abbasid Caliphate
8th-century Arabs
9th-century Arabs
People from Medina
Medieval Arabic singers
Year of birth unknown
Year of death unknown